Edwin Earl Floyd (8 May 1924, in Eufaula, Alabama – 9 December 1990) was an American mathematician, specializing in topology (especially cobordism theory).

Education and career
Floyd studied received in 1943 his bachelor's degree from the University of Alabama and in 1948 his Ph.D. from the University of Virginia under Gordon Whyburn with thesis The extension of homeomorphisms. He was in the academic year 1948–1949 an instructor at Princeton University and became in 1949 a member of the faculty of the University of Virginia, where in the 1960s he collaborated with Pierre Conner in research on cobordism theory. At the University of Virginia, he was the chair of the department of mathematics from 1966 to 1969 and since 1966 the Robert C. Taylor Professor of Mathematics. In 1974 he became the dean of the Faculty of Arts and Sciences and in 1981 the vice-president and provost of the university. In the academic years 1958/59 and 1963/64 he was a visiting scholar at the Institute for Advanced Study.

From 1960 to 1964 he was a Sloan Fellow. In 1962 he was an invited speaker at the International Congress of Mathematicians in Stockholm and gave a talk Some connections between cobordism and transformation groups. In 1964 he was the Hedrick Lecturer of the Mathematical Association of America. In 1981 he received the Thomas Jefferson Award of the University of Virginia. His burial was in University Cemetery, Charlottesville, Virginia.

Personal life
Floyd had a daughter, Sally.

Selected publications

Articles

with R. W. Richardson: 
with Pierre E. Conner: 
with P. E. Conner: 
with P. E. Conner: 
with P. E. Conner:

Books
with Pierre E. Conner:  2nd edn. 1979
with P. E. Conner: 
with P. E. Conner:

References

20th-century American mathematicians
1924 births
1990 deaths
People from Eufaula, Alabama
University of Alabama alumni
University of Virginia alumni
University of Virginia faculty
Institute for Advanced Study visiting scholars
Topologists
Mathematicians from Alabama